David Sherry (born 1974) is an artist.

Sherry was born in Northern Ireland before studying at the Glasgow School of Art. He is best known for his performance art. Stitching is a video of him stitching pieces of wood to his feet while he offers verbal instructions on how to do this. Other works include Carrying a bucket of water about for a week and Avoiding eye contact for one seven-day period, both of which consist of the activities in their titles. Sherry has said he is trying to "expose the systematic processes of day to day life".

In 2003, Sherry was shortlisted for the Beck's Futures prize.

In 2006 Sherry exhibited at WestGermany Gallery, Berlin. The exhibition was entitled 'Solid'.

In 2012 Flawedcore Records released Sherry's album of spoken word and music "I Love Those Paintings". This release triggered a curated group exhibition by Mother's Tankstation, an art gallery in Dublin, Ireland.

He lives and works in Glasgow.

References

1974 births
Living people
Alumni of the Glasgow School of Art
Artists from Northern Ireland
Scottish artists
Performance artists from Northern Ireland
Scottish performance artists